Tim Rigby was the 5 and 6 co-anchor and 11 PM solo anchor for WJAC-TV in Johnstown, Pa. He had been the long-serving sportscaster (1981-2011). sports.

Rigby joined WJAC in May 1981 as a reporter and weekend sports anchor. In November 1981, he began anchoring the weekday sports segments at 11 PM. On December 11, 1996, he briefly left WJAC to take a non-broadcasting job in Johnstown, Pennsylvania, but returned three weeks later.

In 1994, Rigby was voted the #1 play-by-play man in Pennsylvania from the Pennsylvania Association of Broadcasters and the Associated Press for his coverage of the All-American Amateur Baseball Association tournament. He has also reported play-by-play for the Johnstown Chiefs and for other local events.

Rigby has suffered a series of health problems. In February 2005, he was diagnosed with kidney disease and underwent a kidney transplant. A year and a half later in October 2006, he was diagnosed with Anaplastic Lymphoma. He underwent chemotherapy and returned to work on April 23, 2007. In December 2021, Rigby announced that he would be undergoing a second Kidney Transplant, with his donor being Pennsylvania State Representative Jim Rigby. 

Rigby added the five o'clock co-news anchor with Jennifer Johnson. Rigby left WJAC on November 10, 2011 after his contract was not renewed. He  returned as a fill-in sports anchor, most recently June 26, 2013.  On Wednesday, March 25, 2015, Rigby returned as WJAC's 6 News at Sunrise co-anchor with Lindsay Ward and Jim Burton, who both left the station. On March 1, 2018, he moved back to the 5,6, and 11 PM Newscast with Jen Johnson after Marty Radovanic retired in October 2017.

References
"An Anchor's Holiday Blessing" By: Mike Mastovich The Tribune Democrat 12-24-06
"End of an era for local sports anchor" By: Mike Mastovich The Tribune Democrat 11-10-11

External links

Tim Rigby WJAC Bio
Tim Rigby "Through The Years"

American television journalists
American sports announcers
People from Johnstown, Pennsylvania
Year of birth missing (living people)
Living people
American male journalists